All India Socialist Youth Council is a political youth movement in India. It was the youth wing of Samajwadi Janata Party. The president of AISYC 1992–1996 was Bakta Charan Das.

References

Youth wings of political parties in India
Youth councils